The following is a list of events that affected radio broadcasting in 2015. Events listed include radio program debuts, finales, cancellations, station launches, closures and format changes, as well as information about controversies.

Notable events

January

February

March

April

May

June

July

August

September

October

November

December

Debuts

Closings

Deaths
January 1: Mario Cuomo, 82. Former Governor of New York and early progressive talk radio host.
January 2: Little Jimmy Dickens, 94. Frequent host and member of the Grand Ole Opry; country musician and comedian.
January 4: Lance Diamond, 68. Radio host on WJYE and musician.
January 7: Bernard Maris, 68, French journalist and radio presenter (killed in the terrorist attack on the Charlie Hebdo offices in Paris.
January 9: Bud Paxson, 79. Radio and television owner, founder of Paxson Communications.
January 15: Raoul Pantin, 71, Trinidadian journalist and broadcaster
January 17: Justin Kili, 61, Papua New Guinean journalist and radio personality
January 24: Joe Franklin, 88. Television and radio host based in New York City.
January 26: Christopher “Kit” Carson, 58. Chief assistant on The Rush Limbaugh Show.
February 9: Richard Sher, 66, US radio quiz show host (Says You!)
February 12
Alison Gordon, 72, Canadian sports journalist, writer and broadcaster
Gary Owens, 80, DJ at several stations from 1952 to 2007, most notably KMPC in Los Angeles; voiced thousands of commercials and cartoon characters, was the announcer on Rowan & Martin's Laugh-In and hosted a daily program on the syndicated Music of Your Life network.
February 14: Bernd Dost, 75, German journalist and broadcaster
February 15: Sergio Blanco, 66, Spanish singer (Sergio y Estíbaliz), Eurovision entrant
February 19: Warren Thomson, 79, Australian pianist and broadcaster
March 5: Fred Latremouille, 69, Canadian radio host.
March 11: Tony Fenton, 53, Irish radio presenter
 April 3: Paul Grigoriu, 70, Romanian radio personality (SRR).
 April 5: Gordon Moyes, 76, Australian radio evangelist and politician
 April 7: Stan Freberg, 88. Host of The Stan Freberg Show and When Radio Was, advertising executive and actor.
 April 14 : Roberto Tucci, 93, Italian Roman Catholic prelate, President of Vatican Radio (1985–2001)
 April 16 : Nimal Mendis, 81, Sri Lankan singer and songwriter
 April 17 : Don Quayle, 84, journalist and NPR's first president.
 May 1: David Day, 63, Australian radio broadcaster, 5KA
 May 14: B.B. King, 89, Blues musician whose career and stage name originated from his stint as an air personality at WDIA/Memphis.
 May 15: John Stephenson, 91. American radio, television and voice actor (radio work included roles on It's Always Sunday and The Count of Monte Cristo, and later commercials for Accountemps).
 May 23: Anne Meara, 85, Actress, singer, writer, producer and comedian (as one half of Stiller & Meara with husband Jerry Stiller), recipient of a Clio Award for her work with her husband in a series of radio ads for Blue Nun Wine.
 June 11: Jim Ed Brown, 81, American country musician. Member of the Grand Ole Opry since 1963 and host of the Country Music Greats Radio Hour since 2003.
 June 12: Monica Lewis, 93, American actress and singer, notable for being the voice of the Chiquita Banana girl and the host of her own radio program on WMCA/New York City.
 July 6: Stan Carew, 64, musician and regular host on CBC Radio.
 July 13: J. R. Gach, 63. Shock jock with various stops across the United States.
 July 17: Van Miller, 87. Longtime radio play-by-play announcer, best-known work was as voice of the Buffalo Bills Radio Network from 1960–71 and 1978–2003; other notable roles included calling the Buffalo Braves, Buffalo Stallions, Niagara Purple Eagles, and various non-sports roles at WFCB/Dunkirk, New York and WBEN/Buffalo, New York
 July 24: Peg Lynch, 98. American comedy writer and radio actress (most famous for her roles in the 1950s sitcom Ethel and Albert and its successor, The Couple Next Door)
 July 31: Alan Cheuse, 75. Novelist, George Mason University creative writing instructor, and literary commentator for NPR's All Things Considered
 August 25: Marguerite McDonald, 73. Canadian radio journalist, original host of CBC Radio's The House.
 August 29: Luo Lan, 95, Taiwanese writer and radio personality
 October 1: Usnija Redžepova, 69, Serbian singer who began her career on radio
 October 26: Ed Walker, 83. Washington, DC radio personality (work at several stations and programs, most notably with WRC's The Joy Boys and WAMU-FM's The Big Broadcast).
 December 27: Dave "Hendu" Henderson, 56. Radio commentator (and former player) for the Seattle Mariners.

References

 
Radio by year